Robert Francis Dunn (born June 15, 1928) is a vice admiral in the United States Navy. He was Chief of the United States Naval Reserve from October 1982 until November 1983. As a vice admiral, Dunn also served as Commander, Naval Air Force Atlantic Fleet from 1983 to 1986, and as Deputy Chief of Naval Operations for Air Warfare from 1987 to his retirement in 1989.

Early life and education 
Born in Chicago on June 15, 1928, Dunn is a 1951 graduate of the United States Naval Academy.

Civilian career 
After retiring from the military, Dunn served a stint as president of the Naval Historical Foundation.

Personal life 
Dunn is married to Claire Snyder Leaver. Together, they have four children.

Awards
Dunn's awards include the Gray Eagle Award, Distinguished Flying Cross, Air Medal, Silver Star and Bronze Star Medal.

Bibliography

Critical studies and reviews of Dunn's work
Gear up, mishaps down

References

1928 births
Living people
Military personnel from Chicago
United States Naval Academy alumni
United States Naval Aviators
United States Navy personnel of the Korean War
United States Navy personnel of the Vietnam War
Recipients of the Distinguished Flying Cross (United States)
Recipients of the Legion of Merit
Recipients of the Silver Star
Recipients of the Navy Distinguished Service Medal
United States Navy vice admirals